The Yuzhno–Uralskaya Railway (Южно-Уральская железная дорога; "South Ural Railway") is a subsidiary of the Russian Railways headquartered in Chelyabinsk. It operates the railways in the Orenburg, Chelyabinsk, Kurgan, and Sverdlovsk regions as well as the Republic of Bashkortostan. Their total length is 4,935 km. Several stretches of the railway cross the territory of what is now Kazakhstan.

The railway was part of the Ural, or Perm, Railway until 1934. The Chelyabinsk–Yekaterinburg line was constructed in the 1880s and early 1890s as part of the Trans-Siberian Railway (its southern route). The Orenburg–Samara line was opened in 1877. Several other lines were added during Joseph Stalin's industrialization to serve the Magnitogorsk Iron and Steel Works and other newly built factories.

External links 

 Official website

Railway lines in Russia
Railway lines opened in 1934
Rail transport in Orenburg Oblast
Rail transport in Chelyabinsk Oblast
Trans-Siberian Railway
1934 establishments in the Soviet Union